Don't Try This at Home may refer to:

 Don't Try This at Home (Billy Bragg album)
 Don't Try This at Home (The Dangerous Crew album), or the title song
 Don't Try This at Home (Michael Brecker album), or the title song
 Don't Try This at Home (TV series), a British game show
 "Don't Try This at Home", a song by Chumbawamba from Readymades
 "Don't Try This at Home", a song by Mr. Bumpy (voiced by Jim Cummings) in an episode of the TV series Bump in the Night
 Don't Try This at Home, an album by Spock's Beard
 Don't Try This at Home: The Steve-O Video, compilations of Jackass outtakes